The following are the national records in speed skating in Great Britain maintained by the National Ice Skating Association of Great Britain & N.I. (NISA).

Men

Women

References

External links
NISA website
British records

National records in speed skating
Speed skating-related lists
Speed skating
Speed skating
Records